The mile (mi.) is an English unit of units of length that equals 1.609344 kilometers. It is sometimes distinguished as the "land mile", "statute mile", or "international mile".

Mile may also refer to:

Units
Airline mile, a frequent-flyer program measure equivalent or convertible to points, which customers may redeem for air travel or other rewards
 Geographical mile
 Metric mile, an informal term for 1500 or 1600 m
 Nautical mile (M, NM, nmi)
 Scandinavian mile
 Scots mile
 US survey mile
 Historical foreign units translated as "mile":
 Arabic mile (al-mīl)
 Austrian mile
 Chinese mile (li)
 Croatian mile
 Danish mile
 German mile
 Greek & Byzantine mile (mílion)
 Hungarian mile
 Irish mile
 Italian mile
 Portuguese mile
 Prussian mile
 Roman mile ( & al.)
 Russian mile (milya)
 Welsh mile ( or )

Places
 Mile City, Yunnan, China
 Mile High City, nickname for Denver, Colorado
 Mile, Visoko, a medieval place in Bosnia
 Mile, Jajce, a village in Bosnia and Herzegovina

People
 Mile (given name), South Slavic masculine given name

Sports
 Mile run, a middle-distance foot race

Religious Figures 
 Mi Le, the Chinese representation of Maitreya Buddha.

Other uses
 Mile (band), an American rock band

See also
Country Mile (disambiguation)
Miles (disambiguation)
Milestone (disambiguation)
Mille (disambiguation)
Myles (given name)
Myles (surname)